Dubai Properties is a property development and management company based in Dubai, United Arab Emirates. The company is a member of the Dubai Holding group.

Dubai Properties is a member of the Dubai Holding group and is based in Dubai, United Arab Emirates. Dubai Properties core activity is the development of large scale residential and commercial property developments within the Emirate of Dubai.

Projects
The portfolio of projects handled by Dubai Properties includes:
Jumeirah Beach Residence
The Walk (Jumeirah Beach Residence)
Business Bay
Executive Towers
Business Bay Hotel
Bay Avenue
Ghoroob, Mirdif
Shorooq, Mirdif
Dubai Internet City
Vision Tower
Bay Square
Jaddaf Waterfront
Mudon
Villanova
Serena
Remraam
Bellevue Towers
Riverside
Manazel Al Khor
The Villa
1/JBR 
Dubai Wharf 
Manazel Al Khor
La Vie

References

Further reading

External links
 

Companies based in Dubai